Pietro Reggio (22 November 1921 – 11 June 1994) was an Italian sailor who competed in the 1952 Summer Olympics and in the 1960 Summer Olympics.

References

External links
 

1922 births
1994 deaths
Italian male sailors (sport)
Olympic sailors of Italy
Sailors at the 1952 Summer Olympics – 6 Metre
Sailors at the 1960 Summer Olympics – 5.5 Metre